Nargund is one of the 224 constituencies in the Karnataka Legislative Assembly of Karnataka a south state of India. It is also part of Dharwad North Lok Sabha constituency.

Members of Legislative Assembly

Mysore State
 1957: Adiveppagouda Siddanagouda Patil, Indian National Congress
 1962: Adiveppagouda Siddanagouda Patil, Indian National Congress
 1967: D. R. Veerappa, Indian National Congress
 1972: J. Y. Venkappa, Indian National Congress

Karnataka State
 1978: B. R. Patil, Indian National Congress (Indira)
 1983: B. R. Yavagal, Janata Party
 1985: B. R. Yavagal, Janata Party
 1989: Siddanagouda Patil, Indian National Congress
 1994: B. R. Yavagal, Janata Dal
 1999: B. R. Yavagal, Indian National Congress
 2004: C. C. Patil, Bharatiya Janata Party
 2008: C. C. Patil, Bharatiya Janata Party
 2013: B. R. Yavagal, Indian National Congress
 2018: C. C. Patil, Bharatiya Janata Party

See also
 Nargund
 Gadag district
 List of constituencies of Karnataka Legislative Assembly

References

 

Assembly constituencies of Karnataka
Gadag district